Theodor Koch-Grünberg (April 9, 1872, in Grünberg, Hesse, German Empire – October 8, 1924, in Caracaraí, Brazil) was a German ethnologist and explorer who made a valuable contribution to the study of the Indigenous peoples in South America, in particular the Pemon of Venezuela and other indigenous peoples in the Amazon region extending South-Western Brazil and a large part of the Vaupés region in Colombia. The 2015 film El abrazo de la serpiente (Embrace of the Serpent)  fictionalizes his illness and final days based on his journals. He was played by actor .

Profiles

Early life
Following his studying humanities at the University of Tübingen, Koch-Grünberg obtained a doctorate in philosophy at Würzburg with a thesis on the Guaicuruan languages. In 1896, he travelled to Brazil for the first time as a member of an expedition led by Hermann Meyer in search of the source of the Xingu River, a tributary of the Amazon River.

First expedition
From 1903–1905, Koch-Grünberg explored the Yapura River and the Rio Negro up to the border of Venezuela. In 1906, he published photogravures of a number of natives he encountered on the expedition in his monumental "Indianertypen aus dem Amazonasgebiet nach eigenen Aufnahmen während seiner Reise in Brasilien" (1906).

A written account of Koch-Grünberg's trip, which included his study of the Baniwa, was published in two volumes in 1910-11 under the title of Zwei Jahre Unter Den Indianern. Reisen in Nord West Brasilien, 1903-1905 (Two Years Among the Indians. Travels in North-West Brazil). He illustrated his account with photographs and his descriptions of Brazilian tribes are still used by anthropologists and ethnologists to this day.

Second expedition and later career
Koch-Grünberg's second major expedition started in 1911. It took him from Manaus, up the Rio Branco to Mount Roraima in Venezuela, where he documented the myths and legends of the Pemon and took many photographs. He incorrectly used the local names Arekuna and Taulipang to describe the indigenous groups he studied, but these are local names for the Pemon.

He then explored the Sierra Parima, the Caura River and the Ventuari River, before reaching the Orinoco River on January 1, 1913.

After spending a short time in San Fernando de Atabapo, at that time the capital of Amazonas Federal Territory, Koch-Grunberg continued his journey along the Casiquiare canal, which links the Orinoco River system with the Amazon, via the Rio Negro.

He then returned to Manaus, before returning to Germany to produce his most important work, Vom Roraima Zum Orinoco (From Roraima to the Orinoco), published in 1917.

Later career and death
Koch-Grünberg does not, in his writing, often complain about privations regarding food and shelter. Based on his account Two Years Among the Indians... he appeared not to have taken precautions against malaria, but in From Roraima to the Orinoco (page 88, German edition), he describes how he protected himself with quinine, following a German tropical medicine handbook for non-doctors (A. Plehn: Kurzgefasste Vorschriften zur Verhütung und Behandlung der wichtigsten tropischen Krankheiten bei Europäern und Eingeborenen für Nichtärzte).

He was the director of Berlin's Ethnographic Museum, where many of the items he collected on his travels are stored.

Koch-Grünberg died suddenly in Brazil in 1924 after contracting malaria on an expedition with the American explorer, geographer, and physician Alexander H. Rice, Jr. and the Portuguese-Brazilian cinematographer Silvino Santos to map the upper reaches of the Rio Branco. The film of the expedition was entitled The Trail of El Dorado.

References

Further reading 
 Theodor Koch-Grünberg 1906 - "Indianertypen aus dem Amazonasgebiet nach eigenen Aufnahmen während seiner Reise in Brasilien" ("Indian Types of the Amazon Basin", Ernst Wasmuth, Berlin) An impressive collection of 141 photogravures of the people he visited on his 1903-1905 visit to Rio Negro.
 Theodor Koch-Grünberg 1909 - "Zwei Jahre unter den Indianern: Reisen in Nordwest-Brasilien 1903-1905" ("Two years among the Indians. Travels in North-West Brazil")
 Theodor Koch-Grünberg 1916 - "Vom Roraima zum Orinoco. Ergebnisse einer Reise in Nordbrasilien und Venezuela in den Jahren 1911–1913." 5 Bände. Strecker und Schröder, Stuttgart. (reissued by Cambridge University Press, 2009)

External links 
 
  Researchproject Koch-Grünberg papers, publications by Michael Kraus at Marburg University (German site)
 

1872 births
1924 deaths
People from Grünberg, Hesse